Caroline Wanjiku Mugane is an attorney and investment banker in Kenya, the largest economy in the East African Community. She is the managing director of Fedha Connect Limited, a company that raises capital for businesses in agribusiness, real estate, oil and gas. She is a member of the board of directors of Kenya Airways, the national airline. She has previously served on the boards of Equity Bank, East African Breweries, and Standard Securities.

Background and education
She was born in Kenya in 1964. She holds the degree of Bachelor of Laws (LLB), obtained from the University of Nairobi. She also holds the postgraduate Diploma in Legal Practice, obtained from the Kenya School of Law, in Karen, Nairobi. Her degree of Master of Laws (LLM), was  obtained from Georgetown University, in the United States.

Work history
Following her graduation from Georgetown Law School, she worked with SG Warburg in London and Johannesburg. In 1998, she and a partner founded First Africa Capital, a finance advisory company based in Nairobi, with offices in Johannesburg and London. In 2006, Standard Chartered Kenya acquired 25% shareholding in First Africa, where Ms. Mugane served as the chief executive officer. In 2009, Standard Chartered acquired 100% of First Africa stock, renaming the company Standard Chartered Securities (SCS). Ms. Wanjiku Mugane served as the CEO at SCS from 2006 until Standard Chartered Bank closed the subsidiary in 2013. In 2001, at the age of 37, she was appointed as a non-executive director of East African Breweries, serving in that capacity until she resigned in 2009. For a number of years prior to 2007, Ms. Wanjiku Mugane served as a non-executive director of Equity Bank.

References

External links
 Kenya: Terror, Trade And Tourists

1964 births
Living people
University of Nairobi alumni
Georgetown University alumni
20th-century Kenyan businesspeople
Kenyan women business executives